Zoran Vuksanović (born 5 March 1972) is a Montenegrin retired footballer who played as a midfielder.

Club career
Born in Tivat, Vuksanović started out at local club Arsenal. He later spent six seasons with Vrbas between 1990 and 1996. After playing one season for Radnički Niš, Vuksanović switched to Hajduk Kula. He made over 100 appearances in the First League of Serbia and Montenegro over the next six seasons. In March 2002, Vuksanović received a six-month ban by the Yugoslav FA for assaulting an assistant referee during a league match.

References

1972 births
Living people
People from Tivat
Association football midfielders
Yugoslav footballers
Serbia and Montenegro footballers
FK Vrbas players
FK Radnički Niš players
FK Hajduk Kula players
Yugoslav Second League players
Second League of Serbia and Montenegro players
First League of Serbia and Montenegro players